Vincenzo Franceschini (Casandrino 1812 – Casandrino 1885) was an Italian painter, mainly depicting landscapes with ruins and the views around Naples. He trained with Anton Sminck van Pitloo, and formed part of the School of Posillipo.

References

1812 births
1885 deaths
Painters from Naples
19th-century Italian painters
19th-century Italian male artists
Italian male painters
Italian landscape painters